The Tatra 70 is a Czechoslovak luxury car that was made by Tatra at Kopřivnice from 1931 to 1937. It succeeded the Tatra 31.

Tatra 70
The model was launched in 1931, the same year as the Tatra 80, and the two models have the same backbone chassis and swing axle suspension. The front wheels have a rigid axle with overhead transverse leaf springs. The rear wheels are on a swing axle with half transverse leaf springs. The Type 70 has disc wheels, whereas the Type 80 has wire wheels.

But the underlying difference is the engine. The Type 80 was given a 5,990 cc, 65-degree V-12 sidevalve engine, but the Type 70 has a water-cooled six-cylinder OHC 3,406 cc engine that produces . The engine camshaft is driven by a bevel. Transmission is via a multi-plate dry clutch and four-speed gearbox to the rear wheels.

The model was offered with a choice of bodies that included a four-seat sedan, two-door coupé, four-door convertible and six-seat limousine. A fire engine version was also built. Total production was 50 cars by 27 April 1932.

Tatra 70A
In 1934 the Tatra 70A replaced the 70. Its engine and transmission were derived from the Type 70 but engine capacity was increased to 3,845 cc. Total production was 70 cars by 28 August 1936.

Production ceased in 1937. However, after the Second World War Tatra built one Tatra 70 from spare parts, which it supplied on 23 May 1947 to President Edvard Beneš.

References

Sources

Automobiles with backbone chassis
Cars introduced in 1931
70